Clifford G. Viner (born 1948) is an American businessman who founded the III Finance hedge fund and is a co-owner of the Florida Panthers.

Biography
Born in Brooklyn, New York. He is of Jewish descent. Viner graduated magna cum laude with a B.S. from the University of Pennsylvania and an M.B.A. from The Wharton School of the University of Pennsylvania. After school, he worked as an analyst at Phoenix Mutual Life Insurance and then as a government securities trader at William Blair & Company in Chicago. In 1982, he co-founded III Offshore Partners, a hedge fund based in Boca Raton, Florida with Warren Mosler.

In 2001, Viner was part of a group of investors led by Alan Cohen that bought a majority interest in the Panthers from Wayne Huizenga (who kept a minority interest). In November 2009, he became co-general partner with Cohen. In 2010, Viner gained control as general partner of the Florida Panthers with minority partners including Stu Siegel, Alan Cohen, and Huizenga. In late 2013, they sold the franchise for $250 million to Vincent Viola.

Viner is a Registered General Securities Principal, General Securities Options Principal, and General Securities Representative of FINRA, a CFTC-Approved Principal, and an Associate Member of the NFA. Viner is heavily involved with the Florida Panthers Foundation which focuses on pediatric oncology causes.

Personal life
 In 2013, Cliff Viner married Eda Viner. Viner has 4 children: Elyse Viner Cromer, Amanda Viner, Eric Viner and Nicole Viner Knopf. Together, they founded the Eda and Cliff Viner Community Scholars Foundation in 2015 with a mission to educate and inspire compassionate young leaders to develop strong character with a vision for success. The Eda and Cliff Viner Community Scholars Foundation has been providing four year scholarships to public Florida Universities and Colleges to academically deserving High School students in Boca Raton and Delray who have financial needs and are community service driven. Eda sits on the board of Florence Fuller Child Development Centers and together they chaired the 2015 and 2016 Wee Dream Ball and raised over 1 Million dollars in Boca Raton, Florida. Cliff Viner sits on the board of the Urban League of the Palm Beaches and is currently the Founder and first President of the Urban League Foundation. Viner is past president and current member of B'nai Torah Congregation in Boca Raton, Florida.

References

1948 births
Businesspeople from Florida
National Hockey League executives
National Hockey League owners
Florida Panthers owners
People from Brooklyn
Wharton School of the University of Pennsylvania alumni
Living people
Businesspeople from New York City